Daniel Francis McWilliams (born February 8, 1956), is a New York City-based comedian, author, and actor, born in Brooklyn. He performed with Funny Gay Males (1988-1993, 2001-2003) and has toured with them throughout the United States, Canada and Australia. He has appeared on The Joan Rivers Show, Comedy Central, The Howard Stern Show, The Joey Reynolds Show and WOR 710AM NY. In addition, he co-authored Growing Up Gay: From Left Out to Coming Out (1995) with fellow Funny Gay Males troupe members Bob Smith and Jaffe Cohen.

He has also performed his one-man show which is known as Twelve Angry Women at the Solo Arts Group in New York City, and he performs weekly at Duplex Cabaret Theatre and other clubs throughout New York City.

Career 
Notable Work: 
 Funny Gay Males
 Growing Up Gay: From Left Out to Coming Out
Awards:
 MAC Award: Comedy Group 1994

See also
 LGBT culture in New York City
 List of LGBT people from New York City
 Stand-up comedy

Notes

1956 births
People from Brooklyn
American gay actors
Gay comedians
Living people
American male comedians
Comedians from New York (state)
21st-century LGBT people
American LGBT comedians